James Duperon Bâby (August 25, 1763 – February 19, 1833) was a judge and political figure in Upper Canada.

Biography
He was born Jacques Bâby, the son of Jacques Bâby dit Duperon, to a prosperous family in Detroit in 1763. His last name is pronounced "Baw-bee" and has been anglicized in different lines (e.g. Baubie, Bauby).  He was educated in Upper Canada (i.e., what is now the province of Ontario), where his uncle, François Bâby, lived. In 1792, he was appointed to the Executive Council and Legislative Council of Upper Canada and became lieutenant for Kent County. In 1793, he was appointed judge in the Western District.

After the Jay Treaty in 1795, the Bâby family left the Detroit area and moved to Sandwich (now Windsor). (Today his house is owned by the Ontario Heritage Trust and is used for government offices.) Over the years, the family acquired large amounts of land in the western region of Upper Canada. Bâby was put in charge of the 1st Kent militia. During the War of 1812, Sandwich was seized by the Americans, and Bâby was later taken prisoner at the Battle of the Thames. During the American occupation, his property suffered extensive damage.

In 1815, he was appointed Inspector General and moved to York (now Toronto), where he was a politician, judge, wealthy landowner, and part of the ruling clique known as the Family Compact. In 1816, he purchased land on the east bank of the Humber, formerly the site of the Seneca Teiaiagon village, land known today as "Bâby Point."

In 1823, he represented Upper Canada in resolving a dispute with Lower Canada over the sharing of customs revenues. A Roman Catholic, he helped establish the first Catholic church at York, St. Paul's.

Baby was also a slave-owner, who advocated for a gradual phase-out of slavery as opposed to outright abolition as proposed by Lieutenant Governor Sir John Graves Simcoe.  The resulting compromise in legislation led to the prohibition of buying or trading slaves but allowed slave owners to keep existing slaves until slavery's outright abolition in 1834.

Personal
He died at York in 1833.

External links 
Biography at the Dictionary of Canadian Biography Online

References

 

James Baby
Beaubien-Casgrain family
1763 births
1833 deaths
People from British Detroit
Members of the Legislative Council of Upper Canada
French Quebecers
Canadian people of the War of 1812
Upper Canada judges
Canadian Roman Catholics